The Alzenberg (1,100 m) is a mountain in the Bavarian Forest, northeast of the town of Freyung and lies in the Bavarian Forest National Park about two kilometres from the German-Czech border. It is almost entirely wooded.

The nearest settlement is the village of Mitterfirmiansreut in the municipality of Philippsreut. Neighbouring mountains are the Almberg (1,140 m) to the south and, in Czechia, the Strážný (1,115 m) to the northeast.

One-thousanders of Germany
Mountains of Bavaria
Mountains of the Bavarian Forest
Freyung-Grafenau